Eight Crazy Nights (also known as Adam Sandler's Eight Crazy Nights) is a 2002 adult animated Hanukkah musical comedy film directed by Seth Kearsley and produced, co-written by and starring Adam Sandler in his first voice-acting role alongside Jackie Titone, Austin Stout and Rob Schneider. The film is animated in the style of television holiday specials and, unlike most mainstream holiday films, centers on Jewish characters during the Hanukkah season, as opposed to the Christian celebration of Christmas.

Happy Madison Productions' first animated film, the title is taken from a line in Sandler's series of songs called "The Chanukah Song" that compares the gift-giving traditions of Christmas and Chanukah: "Instead of one day of presents, we get eight crazy nights!" A new version of "The Chanukah Song" also plays over the film's closing credits. The film grossed $23.8 million of its $34 million budget and received negative reviews on Metacritic. The Rotten Tomatoes consensus calls it a "nauseating concoction", though the animation received some praise.

Plot
In the small fictional town of Dukesberry, New Hampshire, Davey Stone is a 32-year-old Jewish alcoholic troublemaker with a long criminal record whose antics have long earned him the community's animosity. Davey is arrested for refusing to pay his bill at Mr. Chang's Chinese restaurant, attempting to evade arrest, stealing a snowmobile and destroying festive ice sculptures in the process. At Davey's trial, Whitey Duvall, a 69-year-old volunteer referee from Davey's former basketball league, intervenes. At Whitey's suggestion, the judge sentences Davey to community service as a referee-in-training for Whitey's Youth Basketball League. Under the terms of the community service, if Davey commits a crime before his sentence is completed, he will serve ten years in prison.

The next day, Davey's first game ends in disaster. As Davey disrupts and harasses the players, Whitey suffers a grand mal seizure, and the game is abruptly halted, Davey forfeiting it to the opposing team. Attempting to calm Davey down, Whitey takes him to the mall, where they meet Davey's childhood friend Jennifer Friedman and her son Benjamin. Jennifer is now a divorced, single mother having moved back to her hometown and taking a job at the mall after her husband had left her for another woman that he met online. Whitey reminds Davey that he lost his chance with Jennifer twenty years earlier, but Davey secretly still has feelings for her.

As time progresses, Davey and Whitey's relationship strains, especially after Whitey threatens Davey that he will notify the judge when Davey shoplifts a piece of candy; despite letting him off the hook, Whitey keeps to his word and vows to tell the judge if Davey commits another crime. Whitey's various attempts to encourage Davey are met with humiliation and assault. Later, Davey bonds with Benjamin while playing basketball at the community center but Benjamin's unsportsmanlike behavior--egged on by Davey--leads Jennifer to scold Davey for his actions. While the two are driving to their respective homes, they reminisce about their happy childhood together and how much things have changed.

When Davey gets home, his trailer is being burned down by one of the men who lost the basketball match to him. Davey runs into the burning trailer to rescue a Hanukkah card from his late parents, then watches the trailer burn. Whitey opens his home to Davey, who reluctantly accepts; also living there is Whitey's diabetic twin sister, Eleanore; to keep Davey in line, Whitey and Eleanore explain the complex rules of the household, stating that Davey will have to leave if he does not abide.

As Davey slowly starts to turn his life around, his progress screeches to a stop when Whitey recalls what happened twenty years earlier: En route to one of Davey's basketball games, his parents were tragically killed in a car accident, and Davey learned of their deaths after winning the big game. Devastated by the loss of his loving parents and leaping from foster home to foster home, Davey spent the next two decades numbing his pain with alcohol and petty crime and, as a result, ostracized himself away from Jennifer and his other friends. Uncomfortable with this reminder of his tragic, painful childhood, Davey loses his temper and insults Whitey and Eleanore, which results in Whitey kicking Davey out of his home, much to his relief.

Davey spends the rest of the day binge drinking, and that night, he breaks into the closed mall. In his drunken stupor, he imagines the logos of various stores coming to life and confronting him about his inability to grieve, which they identify as the source of his alcoholism. He finally opens his parents' Hanukkah card, which contains a heartfelt message praising him for being a good son and asking him to never change the way he is. Davey finally cries and comes to terms with his loss. Just then, two cops arrive to arrest him, but he escapes and boards a bus to New York City. The bus is then forced to stop when a single thumbtack in the road punctures all eight rear tires. Reminded of the Miracle of Hanukkah, Davey sets out to find Whitey and make amends.

Davey finds Whitey at the All-Star Banquet, an annual town celebration in which one member of the community is recognized for positive contributions with the "Dukesberry All-Star Patch", which Whitey has wanted for 35 years. When Whitey is passed over for seemingly the final time, he decides to move to Florida and live the rest of his life in anonymity, feeling like no one cares about him. Risking arrest, Davey enters the hall and reminds the townspeople of Whitey's many selfless contributions and abuses he's endured throughout his life. Davey leads them to Whitey, who has gone to the mall with Eleanore to "speak to it" one more time. The townspeople thank Whitey for his service over the years, and the Mayor officially grants him the Patch Award, with the previous recipients giving theirs as well.

Davey and Jennifer reconcile, and Whitey goes into a seizure, which he calls "the happiest seizure of my life!"

Voice cast
 Adam Sandler as Davey Stone / Whitey Duvall / Eleanore Duvall / Deer
 Josh Uhler as Young Davey
 Jackie Titone as Jennifer Friedman
 Alison Krauss as Jennifer's singing voice
 Ali Hoffman as Young Jennifer
 Austin Stout as Benjamin Friedman
 Jason Houseman as Benjamin's singing voice
 Rob Schneider as the Narrator / Mr. Chang
 Kevin Nealon as Mayor Dewey
 James Barbour as Mayor Dewey's singing voice
 Norm Crosby as the Judge
 Jon Lovitz as Tom Baltezor
 Tyra Banks as Victoria's Secret gown
 Blake Clark as Radio Shack walkie-talkie
 Peter Dante as Foot Locker referee
 Ellen Albertini Dow as See's Candies box
 Kevin Farley as Panda Express panda
 Lari Friedman as The Coffee Bean & Tea Leaf cup
 Tom Kenny as The Sharper Image chair
 Dylan and Cole Sprouse as KB Toys soldiers
 Carl Weathers as GNC bottle
 Allen Covert as Bus Driver / Mayor Dewey's wife / Old Lady
 Lainie Kazan as Old Lady's singing voice
 Judith Sandler as Mrs. Stone
 Ann Wilson as Mom's singing voice
 Stan Sandler as Mr. Stone
 Richard Page as Dad's singing voice

Production
Eight Crazy Nights was animated by several studios, including Anvil Studios, A. Film A/S, Bardel Entertainment, Goldenbell Animation, Marina Motion Animation, Spaff Animation, Tama Production, Time Lapse Pictures, Warner Bros. Animation, Y. R. Studio and Yowza! Animation. It was the only animated film that Sandler worked on until Hotel Transylvania in 2012, and remains the only traditionally-animated film with his involvement. This was also the first and only film produced by Meatball Productions, the animation division of Happy Madison Productions.

Kearsley revealed in an email to Doug Walker (The Nostalgia Critic) that certain elements of the movie that were notorious, specifically the feces-eating deer scene and even Whitey's voice (which was originally more higher-pitched and annoying), were intended to be cut, but were kept due to "focus groups" who had seen the film (who lowered Whitey's voice down), as well as the fact that the product placements were used without permission.

Music
The soundtrack was released on November 27, 2002 by Columbia/Sony Music Soundtrax. The soundtrack contains every song in the film, including the new installment of "The Chanukah Song" and a deleted song, called "At the Mall", sung by Whitey as he strolls through the mall in an alternate opening, included on the DVD release. The soundtrack was pressed onto vinyl in 2021 for the Vinyl Me, Please record club.

Release

Eight Crazy Nights came in at fifth place on its opening weekend among U.S. box office, making only $14 million since its Wednesday launch. It only grossed a total of $23.6 million in North America and negligible foreign box office receipts, for a total of only $23.8 million worldwide. This made Eight Crazy Nights become a box office bomb, losing an approximate at lowest $10.5 million to up to $44.6 million.

Critical reception
On Rotten Tomatoes, Eight Crazy Nights has an approval rating of 13% based on reviews from 111 critics and an average score of 3.50/10. The site's critical consensus reads: "Sandler returns to his roots in this nauseating concoction filled with potty humor and product placements." On Metacritic, the film has a score of 23% based on reviews from 27 critics, indicating "generally unfavorable reviews". Audiences polled by CinemaScore gave the film an average grade of "B" on an A+ to F scale.

Roger Ebert gave the film two out of four possible stars and criticized the film's dour tone, saying that "The holidays aren't very cheerful in Sandlerville." Matthew Rozsa of Salon called it the best known Hanukkah film despite its poor quality. William Thomas of Empire Magazine gave the film a one out of five stars, saying, "File under 'What the hell were they thinking?'. With this, and Mr. Deeds, Sandler's pulled off quite the combo. Avoid like the plague."

Sandler won a 2003 Kids' Choice Award for "Favorite Voice from an Animated Movie". Sandler was nominated twice for the 2002 Golden Raspberry Award for Worst Actor for his performances in both Eight Crazy Nights and Mr. Deeds.

Home media
It was released on VHS and single- and two-disc edition DVD on November 4, 2003. The two-disc "special edition" features deleted scenes, several audio commentaries, and Sandler's short film "A Day with the Meatball", among other special features. A Blu-ray version of the film was released on December 13, 2016.

See also
 List of American films of 2002
 List of animated feature films of 2002

References

External links

 
 

2002 films
2002 animated films
2000s American animated films
2000s buddy comedy films
2000s English-language films
2000s musical comedy films
Adult animated comedy films
American adult animated films
American animated comedy films
American basketball films
American buddy comedy films
American musical comedy films
Animated musical films
Animation based on real people
Films about alcoholism
Films about orphans
Films produced by Adam Sandler
Films scored by Teddy Castellucci
Films set in 1981
Films set in the 1980s
Films set in 2001
Films set in New Hampshire
Films with screenplays by Adam Sandler
Films with screenplays by Allen Covert
Hanukkah films
Happy Madison Productions films
Columbia Pictures animated films
Columbia Pictures films